The 2013 BNP Paribas Katowice Open was a women's tennis tournament played on indoor clay courts. It was the 1st edition of the BNP Paribas Katowice Open, in the International category of the 2013 WTA Tour. It took place at Spodek arena in Katowice, Poland, from April 8 through April 14, 2013.

Singles main draw entrants

Seeds 

 Rankings are as of April 1, 2013.

Other entrants 
The following players received wildcards into the singles main draw:
  Marta Domachowska
  Karolína Plíšková
  Sandra Zaniewska

The following players received entry from the qualifying draw:
  Alexandra Cadanțu
  Maria Elena Camerin
  Jill Craybas
  Anna Karolína Schmiedlová

The following player received entry as a lucky loser:
  Shahar Pe'er

Withdrawals 
Before the tournament
  Petra Cetkovská
  Polona Hercog
  Tamira Paszek
  Magdaléna Rybáriková (low back injury)

Retirements
 During the tournament
  Julia Görges (dizziness)
  Andrea Hlaváčková (dizziness)

Doubles main draw entrants

Seeds 

 Rankings are as of April 1, 2013.

Other entrants 
The following pairs received wildcards into the doubles main draw:
  Magdalena Fręch /  Katarzyna Pyka
  Paula Kania /  Sandra Zaniewska

Withdrawals 
Before the tournament
  Akgul Amanmuradova (right elbow injury)
  Magdalena Fręch (viral illness)

Retirements 
During the tournament
  Irina-Camelia Begu (right shoulder injury)

Champions

Singles 

 Roberta Vinci def.  Petra Kvitová, 7–6(7–2), 6–1

Doubles 

 Lara Arruabarrena /  Lourdes Domínguez Lino def.  Raluca Olaru /  Valeria Solovyeva, 6–4, 7–5

References

External links 
 

BNP Paribas Katowice Open
Katowice Open
Katowice Open
April 2013 sports events in Europe